An act for the relief and civilization of the Chippewa Indians in the State of Minnesota (51st-1st-Ex.Doc.247), commonly known as the Nelson Act of 1889, was a United States federal law intended to relocate all the Anishinaabe people in Minnesota to the White Earth Indian Reservation in the western part of the state, and expropriate the vacated reservations for sale to European settlers.

Approved by Congress on January 14, 1889, the Nelson Act was the equivalent for reservations in Minnesota to the Dawes Act of 1887, which had mandated allotting communal Indian lands to individual households in Indian Country, and selling the surplus. The goal of the Nelson Act was to consolidate Native Americans within the state of Minnesota on a western reservation, and, secondly, to encourage allotment of communal lands to individual households in order to encourage subsistence farming and assimilation. It reflected continuing tensions between whites and American Indians in the state. Especially after the Dakota Conflict of 1862, many Minnesota white residents were eager to consolidate the reservations, reduce the amount of land controlled by Indians and make the surplus available for sale and settlement by European settlers.

Minnesota congressmen Knute Nelson pushed for the allotment of Ojibwe lands in Northern Minnesota and sale of "surplus" to non-Natives. He and others intended to force the Ojibwe to relinquish most of their reservation lands. The intention was to relocate the peoples to the westernmost White Earth Reservation. All would receive individual allotments, with the remainder to be available for sale to European settlers. These actions were illegal and violated the treaties which the US had made with the tribes, but the government proceeded anyway. The Red Lake Band of Chippewa agreed to a cession of 3,000,000 acres of land and kept the southern portion of their Reservation adjacent to Red Lake.

Affected Tribes
 Red Lake Band of Chippewa Indians
 Pembina Band of Chippewa Indians
 Winnebagoshish Band of Pillager Chippewa
 Leech Lake Band of Pillager Chippewa
 Cass Lake Band of Pillager Chippewa
 Otter Tail Lake Band of Pillager Chippewa
 Mille Lac Band of Mississippi Chippewa
 Fond du Lac Band of Lake Superior Chippewa
 Bois Forte Band of Chippewa Indians
 Grand Portage Band of Chippewa
 White Oak Point Band of Mississippi Chippewa
 Sandy Lake Band of Mississippi Chippewa
 Snake River Band of St. Croix Chippewa Indians
and other scattered Indians belonging to said tribes not residing on any reservation.

References

Further reading
William Watts Folwell, A History of Minnesota (Volume IV), St Paul, Minnesota: Minnesota Historical Society Press, 1969, pp. 219–226

External links
The Nelson Act: Promises made, promises broken by Don Wedll, Mille Lacs Band of Ojibwe
Treaties with Minnesota Indians
51st-1st-Ex.Doc.247

Native American history of Minnesota
1889 in American law
Ojibwe in Minnesota
United States federal Native American legislation
1889 in Minnesota